Solaria Nishitetsu Hotel Taipei is a skyscraper hotel located in Wanhua District, Taipei, Taiwan. The hotel will have 300 guest rooms. It will be operated by the Japanese hotel chain Nishitetsu Solaria Hotel (:jp:西鉄ホテルズ) and is planned to open in the summer of 2023. The building is located in close proximity to Ximending and Taipei Main Station. The building is a part of the old Zhonghua Building urban renewal project.

See also 
 List of tallest buildings in Taiwan
 List of tallest buildings in Taipei
 West Gateway Marriott Hotel
 Four Seasons Hotels and Resorts Taipei

References

2022 establishments in Taiwan
Skyscraper hotels in Taipei